The Cleveland Browns are a professional American football team based in Cleveland. Named after original coach and co-founder Paul Brown, they compete in the National Football League (NFL) as a member club of the American Football Conference (AFC) North division. The Browns play their home games at FirstEnergy Stadium, which opened in 1999, with administrative offices and training facilities in Berea, Ohio. The Browns' official club colors are brown, orange, and white. They are unique among the 32 member franchises of the NFL in that they do not have a logo on their helmets.

The franchise was founded in 1944 by Brown and businessman Arthur B. McBride as a charter member of the All-America Football Conference (AAFC), and began play in 1946. The Browns dominated the AAFC, compiling a 47–4–3 record in the league's four seasons and winning its championship in each.  When the AAFC folded after the 1949 season, the Browns joined the NFL along with the San Francisco 49ers and the original Baltimore Colts. The Browns won a championship in their inaugural NFL season, as well as in the 1954, 1955, and 1964 seasons, and in a feat unequaled in any of the North American major professional sports, played in their league championship game in each of their first 10 years of existence, winning seven of those games. From 1965 to 1995, they qualified to play in the NFL playoffs 14 times, but did not win another championship or play in the Super Bowl during that period. 

In 1995, owner Art Modell, who had purchased the Browns in 1961, announced plans to move the team to Baltimore. After threats of legal action from the city of Cleveland and fans, a compromise was reached in early 1996 that allowed Modell to establish the Baltimore Ravens as a new franchise while retaining the contracts of all Browns personnel. The Browns' intellectual property, including team name, logos, training facility, and history, were kept in trust and the franchise was regarded by the NFL as suspended for three seasons. While several of the then-30 existing franchises considered re-locating to Cleveland, in 1998 it was confirmed that the NFL would field 31 teams when the Browns resumed play in 1999, thus while the 1999 Browns were not technically considered to be an expansion franchise, the club's roster was re-stocked via an expansion draft.

Since resuming operations in 1999, the Browns have struggled to find success, especially during the 2010s when they did not post one winning season throughout that decade. They have had only three winning seasons (2002, 2007, and 2020), two playoff appearances (2002 and 2020), and one playoff win (2020), winning less than one third of their games in total, and in 2017 were only the second team in NFL history to have a 0-16 season after the 2008 Detroit Lions. The franchise has also been noted for a lack of stability with head coaches (10 full time - including two who were fired after only one season - and two interim since 1999) and quarterbacks (34 different starters since 1999). From 2003 to 2019, the Browns had a 17-season playoff drought, which ended during the 2020 season. They are one of four teams to have never appeared in a Super Bowl, along with the Detroit Lions, Houston Texans, and Jacksonville Jaguars.

History

The history of the Cleveland Browns American football team began in 1944 when taxi-cab magnate Arthur B. "Mickey" McBride secured a Cleveland franchise in the newly formed All-America Football Conference (AAFC). Paul Brown was the team's namesake and first coach. The Browns began play in 1946 in the AAFC. The Browns won each of the league's four championship games before the league dissolved in 1949. The team then moved to the more established National Football League (NFL), where it continued to dominate. Between 1950 and 1955, Cleveland reached the NFL championship game every year, winning three times.

McBride and his partners sold the team to a group of Cleveland businessmen in 1953 for a then-unheard-of $600,000. Eight years later, the team was sold again, this time to a group led by New York advertising executive Art Modell. Modell fired Brown before the 1963 season, but the team continued to win behind running back Jim Brown. The Browns won the championship in 1964 and reached the title game the following season, losing to the Green Bay Packers.

When the AFL and NFL merged before the 1970 season, Cleveland became part of the new American Football Conference (AFC). While the Browns made it back to the playoffs in 1971 and 1972, they fell into mediocrity through the mid-1970s. A revival of sorts took place in 1979 and 1980, when quarterback Brian Sipe engineered a series of last-minute wins and the Browns came to be called the "Kardiac Kids". Under Sipe, however, the Browns did not make it past the first round of the playoffs. Quarterback Bernie Kosar, whom the Browns drafted in 1985, led the team to three AFC Championship games in the late 1980s but lost each time to the Denver Broncos.

In 1995, Modell announced he was relocating the Browns to Baltimore, sowing a mix of outrage and bitterness among Cleveland's dedicated fan base. Negotiations and legal battles led to an agreement where Modell would be allowed to take his personnel to Baltimore as an expansion franchise, called the Baltimore Ravens, but would leave Cleveland the Browns' colors, logos and heritage for a reactivated Browns franchise that would take the field no later than 1999.

After three years of inactivity while Cleveland Stadium was demolished and FirstEnergy Stadium was built on its site, the Browns were reactivated and started play again in 1999 under new owner Al Lerner. The Browns struggled throughout the 2000s and 2010s, posting a record of 101–234–1 since their 1999 return. The Browns have only posted three winning seasons and two playoff appearances (2002, 2020) since returning to the NFL. The team's struggles have been magnified since 2012, when the Lerner family sold the team to businessman Jimmy Haslam. In six seasons under Haslam's ownership, the Browns went through four head coaches and four general managers, none of whom had found success. In 2016 and 2017 under head coach Hue Jackson, the Browns went 1–31 (including a winless 0–16 season in 2017), the worst two-year stretch in NFL history, and received the number one overall draft pick in both of those years. In 2020, the Browns secured their first playoff berth since 2002 by defeating the Pittsburgh Steelers in week 17 and finishing the season 11–5.

Logos and uniforms

Logos

The Browns are the only National Football League team without a helmet logo. The logoless helmet serves as the Browns' official logo. The organization has used several promotional logos throughout the years; players' numbers were painted on the helmets from 1957 to 1960; and an unused "CB" logo was created in 1965. But for much of their history, the Browns' helmets have been an unadorned burnt orange color with a top stripe of dark brown (officially called "seal brown") divided by a white stripe.

The team has had various promotional logos throughout the years, such as the "Brownie Elf" mascot or a Brown "B" in a white football. While Art Modell did away with the elf in the mid-1960s (believing it to be too childish), its use has been revived since the team's return in 1999. The popularity of the Dawg Pound section at First Energy Stadium has led to a brown and orange dog being used for various Browns functions. But overall, the orange, logo-less helmet continues as the primary trademark of the Cleveland Browns. The Browns have used special commemorative logos during individual seasons, such as the 1999 logo to celebrate the team's return to the NFL, a 60th-anniversary logo for the 2006 season, and a 75th-anniversary logo in 2021.

The current logos and wordmarks were introduced on February 24, 2015, with the helmet design remaining largely as is, the only differences being minor color changes to the shade of orange used on the helmet and the facemask being changed from gray to brown.

For the 2022 season - by virtue of a fan poll - the Brownie elf logo is featured at midfield at First Energy Stadium.

Uniforms
The original designs of the jerseys, pants, and socks remained mostly the same, but the helmets went through many significant revisions throughout the years. The Browns uniforms saw their first massive change prior to the 2015 season.

Jerseys:
 Brown – brown (officially "seal brown") with orange-colored numbers and writing, and an orange-white-orange stripe sequence on the sleeves.
 White (away) – white with orange numbers and writing, with a brown-orange-brown stripe sequence.
 Orange – orange with white numerals and writing, and a brown-white-brown stripe sequence.

Pants:
 Brown – brown pants with an orange-white-orange stripe sequence down two-thirds the length of the pants. The other third is the word "BROWNS," written in orange.
 White – white pants with a brown-orange-brown stripes. "BROWNS" is written in brown.
 Orange – orange pants with a brown-white-brown stripe sequence. "BROWNS" is written in brown.

Socks:
 Solid brown.
 Solid white.
 Solid orange.

Helmet: Solid white (1946–1949); solid white for day games and solid orange for night games (1950–1951); orange with a single white stripe (1952–1956); orange with a single white stripe and brown numerals on the sides (1957–1959); orange with a brown-white-brown stripe sequence and brown numerals on the sides (1960); orange with a brown-white-brown stripe sequence (1961–1995 and 1999–present).

Over the years, the Browns have had on-and-off periods of wearing white for their home games, particularly in the 1970s and 80s, as well as in the early 2000s after the team returned to the league. Until recently, when more NFL teams have started to wear white at home at least once a season, the Browns were the only non-subtropical team north of the Mason-Dixon line to wear white at home on a regular basis.

Secondary numerals (called "TV numbers") first appeared on the jersey sleeves in 1961. Over the years, there have been minor revisions to the sleeve stripes, the first occurring in 1968 (brown jerseys worn in early season) and 1969 (white and brown jerseys) when stripes began to be silkscreened onto the sleeves and separated from each other to prevent color bleeding. However, the basic five-stripe sequence has remained intact (with the exception of the 1984 season). A recent revision was the addition of the initials "AL" to honor team owner Al Lerner who died in 2002; this was removed in 2013 upon Jimmy Haslam assuming ownership of the team.

Orange pants with a brown-white-brown stripe sequence were worn from 1975 to 1983 and become symbolic of the "Kardiac Kids" era. The orange pants were worn again occasionally in 2003 and 2004.

Other than the helmet, the uniform was completely redesigned for the 1984 season. New striping patterns appeared on the white jerseys, brown jerseys and pants. Solid brown socks were worn with brown jerseys and solid orange socks were worn with white jerseys. Brown numerals on the white jerseys were outlined in orange. White numerals on the brown jerseys were double outlined in brown and orange. (Orange numerals double outlined in brown and white appeared briefly on the brown jerseys in one pre-season game.) However, this particular uniform set was not popular with the fans, and in 1985 the uniform was returned to a look similar to the original design. It remained that way until 1995.

In 1999, the expansion Browns adopted the traditional design with two exceptions: first, the TV numbers, previously on the sleeves, were moved to the shoulders; and second, the orange-brown-orange pants stripes were significantly widened.

Experimentation with the uniform design began in 2002. An alternate orange jersey was introduced that season as the NFL encouraged teams to adopt a third jersey, and a major design change was made when solid brown socks appeared for the first time since 1984 and were used with white, brown and orange jerseys. Other than 1984, striped socks (matching the jersey stripes) had been a signature design element in the team's traditional uniform. The white striped socks appeared occasionally with the white jerseys in 2003–2005 and 2007.

Experimentation continued in 2003 and 2004 when the traditional orange-brown-orange stripes on the white pants were replaced by two variations of a brown-orange-brown sequence, one in which the stripes were joined (worn with white jerseys) and the other in which they were separated by white (worn with brown jerseys). The joined sequence was used exclusively with both jerseys in 2005. In 2006, the traditional orange-brown-orange sequence returned.

Additionally in 2006, the team reverted to an older uniform style, featuring gray face masks; the original stripe pattern on the brown jersey sleeves (The white jersey has had that sleeve stripe pattern on a consistent basis since the 1985 season.) and the older, darker shade of brown.

The Browns wore brown pants for the first time in team history on August 18, 2008, preseason game against the New York Giants. The pants contain no stripes or markings. The team had the brown pants created as an option for their away uniform when they integrated the gray facemask in 2006. They were not worn again until the Browns "family" scrimmage on August 9, 2009 with white-striped socks. The Browns have continued to wear the brown pants throughout the 2009 season. Browns quarterback Brady Quinn supported the team's move to wearing the brown pants full-time, claiming that the striped pattern on the white pants "prohibit[ed] mobility".
However, the fans generally did not like the brown pants, and after being used for only one season, the team returned to their white shirt-on-white pants in 2010. Coach Eric Mangini told The Plain Dealer the Browns won't use the brown pants anymore. "It wasn't very well-received," Mangini said. "I hope we can get to the point where we can wear fruit on our heads and people wouldn't notice." At the time, the brown pants weren't officially dropped by the team, but simply not used.

The Browns chose to wear white at home for the 2011 season, and wound up wearing white for all 16 games as when they were on the road, the home team would wear their darker colored uniform.

The Browns brought back the brown pants in their home game against the Buffalo Bills on October 3, 2013, on Thursday Night Football, pairing them with the brown jerseys. It marked the first time the team wore an all-brown combination in team history.

On April 14, 2015, the Cleveland Browns unveiled their new uniform combinations, consisting of the team's colors of orange, brown and white.

The Browns brought back the all-brown look for the NFL Color Rush program in 2016, minus the white elements. In 2018 the uniform was worn at home three times. For the 2019 season, the Browns promoted the Color Rush uniform to their primary home uniform and will wear it for six home games as well as any away game in which the home team chooses to wear white (although for the Week 3 game against the Los Angeles Rams, the Browns wore all-orange socks instead of brown.  For the two remaining home games, the browns will wear their previous brown home uniforms as alternate uniforms.

The club unveiled a new uniform design on April 15, 2020. The new uniform design pays homage to the Browns' classic uniform design from years past.

Rivalries
The Browns have rivalries with all three of their AFC North opponents. In addition, the team has had historical rivalries with the Denver Broncos, Detroit Lions, San Francisco 49ers, and Houston Oilers/Tennessee Titans.

Divisional rivalries

Pittsburgh Steelers

Often called the "Turnpike Rivalry", the Browns' biggest rival has long been the Pittsburgh Steelers. Former Browns owner Art Modell scheduled home games against the Steelers on Saturday nights from 1964 to 1970 to help fuel the rivalry. The rivalry has also been fueled by the proximity of the two teams, number of championships both teams have won, players and personnel having played and/or coached for both sides, and personal bitterness. The teams have played twice annually since 1950, making it the oldest rivalry in the AFC and the fifth-oldest rivalry in the NFL. Though the Browns dominated this rivalry early in the series (winning the first eight meetings and posting a 31–9 record in the 1950s and 1960s), the Steelers went 15–5 in the 1970s and 36–9–1 since the Browns returned to the league in 1999. The Steelers have been particularly dominant in Pittsburgh, posting a 44–7 record when hosting the Browns since 1970, including to winning streaks of 16 games (1970–85) and 17 games (2004–20).

The Steelers currently hold a 79–61–1 lead. Though the rivalry has cooled in Pittsburgh due to the Modell move as well as the Browns' poor play since 1999, the Steelers still remain the top rival for Cleveland.

Cincinnati Bengals

Originally conceived due to the personal animosity between Paul Brown and Art Modell, the "Battle of Ohio" between the Browns and the Cincinnati Bengals has been fueled by the sociocultural differences between Cincinnati and Cleveland, a shared history between the two teams, and similar team colors, as Brown used the exact shade of orange for the Bengals that he used for the Browns. (Though this has changed since then, as the Bengals now use a brighter shade of orange.) Modell, in fact, moved the Browns to the AFC after the AFL–NFL merger in order to have a rivalry with the Bengals. The rivalry has also produced two of the eleven highest-scoring games in NFL history. Cincinnati has the all-time edge 51–46. While the Bengals have a 27–19 edge since the Browns returned to the NFL in 1999, this series has been more competitive than the Browns' series with their other division rivals.

Baltimore Ravens

Created as a result of the Browns' relocation controversy, the rivalry between the Browns and Baltimore Ravens was more directed at Art Modell than the team itself, and is simply considered a divisional game in Baltimore. This matchup is more bitter for Cleveland than the others due to the fact that the draft picks for 1995 to 1998 resulted in the rosters that won the Super Bowl for the Ravens in 2000. Had Modell not moved the team, these teams, drafted by general manager and former Browns tight end Ozzie Newsome, might have given the Browns a title after a 35-year drought. The Ravens lead the overall series 34–12. The two teams have not met in the playoffs.

Other rivalries

Detroit Lions
The Browns' rivalry with the Detroit Lions began in the 1950s, when the Browns and Lions played each other in four NFL Championship Games. The Lions won three of those championships, while the Browns won one. This was arguably one of the NFL's best rivalries in the 1950s. Since the NFL-AFL merger of 1970, the teams have met much less frequently with the Browns' move to the AFC. From 2002 to 2014, the two teams played an annual preseason game known as the "Great Lakes Classic".

Denver Broncos

The Browns had a brief rivalry with the Denver Broncos that arose from three AFC Championship Games from 1986 to 1989. In the 1986 AFC Championship, quarterback John Elway led The Drive to secure a tie in the waning moments at Cleveland Municipal Stadium; the Broncos went on to win in 23–20 in overtime. One year later, the two teams met again in the 1987 AFC Championship game at Mile High Stadium. Denver took a 21–3 lead, but Browns' quarterback Bernie Kosar threw four touchdown passes to tie the game at 31–31 halfway through the 4th quarter. After a long drive, John Elway threw a 20-yard touchdown pass to running back Sammy Winder to give Denver a 38–31 lead. Cleveland advanced to Denver's 8-yard line with 1:12 left, but Broncos' safety Jeremiah Castille stripped Browns' running back Earnest Byner of the football at the 2-yard line—a play that has been called The Fumble by Browns' fans. The Broncos recovered it, gave Cleveland an intentional safety, and went on to win 38–33. The two teams met yet again in the 1989 AFC Championship at Mile High Stadium, which the Broncos easily won by a score of 37–21.  

This short-lived rivalry also featured a controversial 16–13 Browns' win at Cleveland Municipal Stadium in the 1989 regular season. The game was decided by a Matt Bahr 48-yard field goal as time expired - a kick that barely cleared the crossbar. Bahr's field goal came after referee Tom Dooley ordered the teams to switch ends of the field midway through the 4th quarter, thanks to rowdy Dawg Pound fans who pelted the Broncos with dog biscuits, eggs and other debris.  The switch gave the Browns a small, timely wind advantage to finish the game.

Denver leads the overall series, 24–7.

San Francisco 49ers
The most competitive team in the AAFC era for the Browns was the San Francisco 49ers. San Francisco finished second to the Browns in each of the four seasons that the league played. The rivalry has turned into a friendly relationship as many 49ers personnel helped the Browns relaunch in 1999, specifically former 49ers president and CEO Carmen Policy and vice president/director of football operations Dwight Clark, who were hired by the expansion Browns in the same roles. Long-time Browns placekicker and fan favorite Phil Dawson and backup quarterback Colt McCoy signed with the 49ers in 2014.

Houston Oilers/Tennessee Titans
The Browns' rivalry with the Houston Oilers/Tennessee Titans dates back to the Browns and then-Oilers being placed in the AFC Central after the AFL-NFL merger.  As such, the teams played each other twice annually from 1970 until the NFL's 2002 realignment placed the Browns in the AFC North and the now-Titans in the AFC South (excluding 1996-98 when the Browns were inactive). The teams have met much less frequently since 2002.  The Browns lead the overall series, 36–32. The Browns' 68 meetings with the Oilers/Titans are the third-most for any opponent, trailing only the Steelers and Bengals.

The height of this rivalry was during the 1980s. Oilers head coach Jerry Glanville and Marty Schottenheimer shared several bitter exchanges during the decade and the Browns and Oilers had their only playoff meeting in the 1988 Wild Card Round, in which the Oilers came away with a narrow 24–23 victory. There have been a few memorable games in recent years.  In , the Browns erased a 28–3 deficit to come away with a 29–28 win.  In a December  contest with playoff implications for both teams, the Browns jumped to a 38–7 halftime lead, setting a franchise record for points in the first half.  However, Tennessee rallied in the second half but came up just short as the Browns hung on for a 41–35 win.

Fan base
A 2006 study conducted by Bizjournal determined that Browns fans are the most loyal fans in the NFL. The study, while not scientific, was largely based on fan loyalty during winning and losing seasons, attendance at games, and challenges confronting fans (such as inclement weather or long-term poor performance of their team). The study noted that Browns fans filled 99.8% of the seats at Cleveland Browns Stadium during the last seven seasons, despite a combined record of 36–76 over that span.

Dawg Pound

Perhaps the most visible Browns fans are those that can be found in the Dawg Pound. Originally the name for the bleacher section located in the open (east) end of old Cleveland Municipal Stadium, the current incarnation is likewise located in the east end of FirstEnergy Stadium and still features hundreds of orange and brown clad fans sporting various canine-related paraphernalia. The fans adopted that name in 1984 after members of the Browns defense used it to describe the team's defense.

Retired cornerback Hanford Dixon, who played his entire career for the Browns (1981–1989), is credited with naming the Cleveland Browns defense 'The Dawgs' in the mid-1980s. Dixon and teammates Frank Minnifield and Eddie Johnson would bark at each other and to the fans in the bleachers at the Cleveland Stadium to fire them up. It was from Dixon's naming that the Dawg Pound subsequently took its title. The fans adopted that name in the years after. Due to this nickname, since the team's revival the Browns have used a bulldog as an alternate logo.

Browns Backers
The most prominent organization of Browns fans is the Browns Backers Worldwide (BBW). The organization has approximately 305,000 members and Browns Backers clubs can be found in every major city in the United States, and in a number of military bases throughout the world, with the largest club being in Phoenix, Arizona. In addition, the organization has a sizable foreign presence in places as far away as Egypt, Australia, Japan, Sri Lanka, and McMurdo Station in Antarctica. According to The Official Fan Club of the Cleveland Browns, the two largest international fan clubs are in Alon Shvut, West Bank and Niagara, Canada, with Alon Shvut having 129 members and Niagara having 310.

Following former Browns owner Randy Lerner's acquisition of English soccer club Aston Villa, official Villa outlets started selling Cleveland Browns goods such as jerseys and NFL footballs. This has raised interest in England and strengthened the link between the two sporting clubs. Aston Villa supporters have set up an organization known as the Aston (Villa) Browns Backers of Birmingham.

Players of note

Current roster

Players enshrined in the Pro Football Hall of Fame

The Cleveland Browns have the fourth-largest number of players enshrined in the Pro Football Hall of Fame with a total of 17 enshrined players elected based on their performance with the Browns, and nine more players or coaches elected who spent at least one year with the Browns franchise. No Browns players were inducted in the inaugural induction class of 1963. Otto Graham was the first Browns player to be enshrined as a member of the class of 1965, and the most recent Browns player to be included in the Pro Football Hall of Fame is Joe Thomas, who was a member of the class of 2023, who is the first member inducted that played in the 21st century.

Cleveland Browns legends

The Cleveland Browns legends program honors former Browns who made noteworthy contributions to the history of the franchise. In addition to all the Hall of Famers listed above, the Legends list includes:

Pro Bowlers

Retired uniform numbers

Ring of Honor
Beginning in 2010, the Browns established a Ring of Honor, honoring the greats from the past by having their names displayed around the upper deck of FirstEnergy Stadium. The inaugural class in the Browns Ring of Honor was unveiled during the home opener on September 19, 2010, and featured the 16 Hall of Famers listed above who went into the Hall of Fame as Browns. In 2018, Joe Thomas was entered into the Ring of Honor with the number 10,363 – commemorating his NFL record of consecutive snaps played on offense. In 2019, four-time Pro Bowl linebacker Clay Matthews Jr. was entered into the Ring of Honor.

Statues
Numerous Browns players and staff have had statues made in their honor:
 
In and around First Energy Stadium
 1964 NFL Champion and Hall of Fame running back Jim Brown – since 2016
 Three-time NFL Champion and Hall of Fame quarterback Otto Graham – since 2019

In and around Cleveland
 Late owner Alfred Lerner in front of the team's headquarters/practice facility in Berea, Ohio – since 2003
 Browns Hall of Fame offensive tackle/kicker Lou Groza in front of a youth football field that bears his name, also in Berea – since 2016

Murals
Browns players featured on murals in downtown Cleveland include:
Jim Brown (along with other Cleveland dignitaries as under the banner "Cleveland is The Reason")
Myles Garrett (depicted as a child with his grandmother in Playhouse Square)

Streets
The street near First Energy Stadium in Cleveland was renamed "Alfred Lerner Way" in 2002 after the late owner.
The street in Berea, Ohio where the Browns headquarters and practice facility are located is named "Lou Groza Boulevard".

Starting quarterbacks

First-round draft picks

Coaches of note

Head coaches

Current staff

Media

Radio

WKNR (850 AM), WKRK-FM (92.3 FM), and WNCX (98.5 FM) serve as co-flagship stations for the Cleveland Browns Radio Network. Lead announcer Jim Donovan calls games on-site alongside Nathan Zegura – who made news when he had to serve an eight-game suspension due to arguing with officials during a game in 2018 when he was sideline reporter, and former NFL player and current WKNR host Je'Rod Cherry, who serves as sideline analyst/reporter.  Cherry, WKRK's Ken Carman, and WKNR's Tony Rizzo host the network pregame show, while WKRK's Jeff Phelps and Cherry host the network postgame show.

TV

Cleveland ABC affiliate WEWS-TV 5 serves as the broadcast TV home of the Browns, airing year-round team programming as well as all non-network preseason games, with the broadcast team of Chris Rose (play-by-play), former Browns left tackle Joe Thomas (analyst), and Aditi Kinkhabwala (sidelines). Bally Sports Great Lakes is the cable outlet for the team, airing various Browns related programming during the season.

Honors

The Browns in-house production team won a pair of Lower Great Lakes Emmy Awards in 2005. One was for a primetime special honoring the 1964 NFL Championship team (The 1964 Championship Show) and one was for a commercial spot (The Paperboy).

References in popular culture
The Browns have (either directly or indirectly) been featured in various movies and TV shows over the years. Notable examples include:
 Cleveland native Arsenio Hall's television program, The Arsenio Hall Show, is known for the audience's shouting "Woof, woof, woof!" while pumping their fists—a chant that was used by fans of the Browns. He would refer to a section of the live audience as his "Dawg Pound".
 On Living Single, Overton Wakefield Jones (John Henton) is a die-hard Cleveland Browns fan. On the episode "Living Single Undercover" season 4, episode 20, (aired April 10, 1997), Overton is sore over the Browns moving to Baltimore becoming the Ravens. Henton was born and raised in Cleveland, like his character on the show. Jim Brown guest starred in that episode.
 On The Drew Carey Show, Browns quarterback Bernie Kosar appears (uncredited) in the episode "Drewstock" (aired January 29, 1997). In the episode "Drew Goes To The Browns Game", (aired September 29, 1999), Drew attends the Browns' first regular-season game since re-joining the NFL. (In real life, Drew Carey actually did appear on-field at the first regular-season game when the team returned in 1999.)
 Cleveland Brown is the name of a character originally featured on the Fox TV show Family Guy, and the central character of the spin-off series The Cleveland Show.
 On the TV show How I Met Your Mother, in the seventh-season premiere, the main characters go to a Cleveland Browns-themed wedding.
 The Browns have been featured on some level in episodes of Hot In Cleveland and even in promotional videos using at least one of the main characters. In the episode "How Did You Guys Meet, Anyway?" (January 4, 2012), the characters reminisce about how they met in the 1980s while waiting in the restroom line at a Cleveland Browns game. In the episode "God and Football" (January 18, 2012), Melanie (Valerie Bertinelli) develops a relationship with the Browns placekicker (played by Dan Cortese). In the episode "The Gateway Friend" (May 2, 2012) Browns wide receiver/return specialist Josh Cribbs appears as himself portraying a karaoke contestant. After Super Bowl XLVI, Betty White appears in a video as Elka wearing a Browns jacket congratulating the New York Giants and hoping that the Browns win it one season. After the first round of the 2014 NFL draft, the four main characters appear in a video welcoming Justin Gilbert and Johnny Manziel to the Browns.
 The 1966 film The Fortune Cookie with Jack Lemmon and Walter Matthau features the Browns and the city of Cleveland throughout the movie and was made with the cooperation of the Browns.
 The 2008 film The Express: The Ernie Davis Story explains how Ernie Davis is traded to the Browns by the Washington Redskins. Early in the film, Jim Brown is taking photos in his Browns uniform after being drafted by them. Later in the film, it shows Davis struggling with leukemia after being drafted and the Browns hold a special pre-game ceremony for him.
 In the 2010 film Hot Tub Time Machine, the Browns defeat the Broncos and win the 1986 AFC Championship Game (the game famous for former Denver Broncos quarterback John Elway's 98-yard drive). It is explained that the reason why the Browns win this game is due to the butterfly effect.
 In the 2014 film Draft Day, fictional Browns general manager Sonny Weaver, Jr. (Kevin Costner) attempts to land the number one pick in the NFL draft.

References

Further reading

External links

 
 Cleveland Browns at the National Football League official website

 
National Football League teams
American football teams established in 1946
1946 establishments in Ohio
Jimmy Haslam
Sports teams in Ohio